Freddie 'Red' Cochrane (born May 6, 1915 in Elizabeth, New Jersey, United States, and died January 1, 1993), was a professional boxer who held the World Welterweight Championship from 1941 until 1946. Cochrane was a resident of Union, New Jersey at the time of his death.

Professional boxing career
Cochrane turned pro in 1933 and was considered the World Welterweight champion in 1941 after beating Fritzie Zivic. Although he technically held the title for more than four years, he did not successfully defend it once due to World War II. In 1945 he fought a war with the legendary Rocky Graziano in what was proclaimed 1945 Fight of the Year by Ring Magazine. Graziano was outboxed in the first eight rounds, but knocked down Cochrane in the 9th but the bell saved Cochrane from a KO. Cochrane was dropped again in the 10th for the full count. The Paid attendance for the bout was 18,071. Two months later he rematched Graziano and again was KO'd in the 10th round. Cochrane knocked down for seven nine counts before he took the full count in the tenth. The Paid attendance for the bout was 18,071 with a gate of $100,469. With this bout, Graziano became the latest "Million Dollar Baby".

In 1946, Cochrane took on Marty Servo for the World Welterweight Title and lost via 4th-round KO. Servo would relinquish the crown in September due to "an aching nose". Sugar Ray Robinson would then win the vacant title in December.

Professional boxing record
All information in this section is derived from BoxRec, unless otherwise stated.

Official record

All newspaper decisions are officially regarded as “no decision” bouts and are not counted in the win/loss/draw column.

Unofficial record

Record with the inclusion of newspaper decisions in the win/loss/draw column.

See also
List of welterweight boxing champions

References

External links 
 

1915 births
1993 deaths
Sportspeople from Elizabeth, New Jersey
People from Union Township, Union County, New Jersey
Welterweight boxers
World welterweight boxing champions
World boxing champions
American male boxers